The first season of Calle 7 was premiered on March 2, 2009, and the competition started on March 8, 2009. On Mondays and Wednesdays the two teams compete with each other during three contests with a point system of 100, 200 and 300 points deciding the winner, while on Tuesdays and Thursdays, the losing team from the previous day has to nominate one candidate for the final day of elimination on that week's Friday. Also Jean Philippe Cretton became part of the program as the host of Calle 7 onLine.

The Final was on July 31, 2009 having 15 points of rating with a peak of 23 points. Francisco "Chapu" Puelles was the winner winning 5 million chilean pesos (US$9,500), Valentina Roth, who get the second place, obtain 500,000 chilean pesos (US$930). Felipe Camus obtain a symbolic prize for being "Best Teammate" of the program and Francisco "Chapu" Puelles who get the big final prize also obtain the prize "Calle 7 Spirit" for being the best to represent the values that the program wants to give, as good competition and friendship.

Teams 

 due to an injury that lasted for more than two days, he gave his place to Daniel Fernández
 due to medical reasons that lasted for more than two days, she gave his place to Constanza Vivas
 entered due to winning by public support
 entered due to winning the repechaje on points
 joined due to a decision of the winner of elimination between Yellow and Red (Francisco Rodriguez Prat)

Teams competition
{| class="wikitable"
|-
!width="150"|Week
!width="150"|Immunity
!width="150"|1st Nominated
!width="150"|2nd Nominated
!width="150"|3rd Nominated
!width="150"|4th Nominated
!width="150"|Extra nominated
!width="150"|Saved
!width="150"|Eliminated
|-
|March 9 — 13
 Not Immunity
Felipe Arancibia
Camila Lobos 
Iair Motles
Juan Pablo Alfonso 
!—
Not Saved
 Felipe Arancibia
|-
|March 16 — 20
 Belén Muñoz
 Felipe Camus
 Daniel Fernández
 Iair Motles
 Noelia Gramajo
 Camila Lobos
 Felipe Camus
 Camila Lobos
|-
|March 23 — 27
!—
|Paz Gómeznominated by Valentina R.
|Francisco "Pancho" Rodrígueznominated by Noelia
|Daniel Fernándeznominated by Felipe C.
|Belén Muñoznominated by Gianella
!—
|Belén Muñoz
|Paz Gómez
|-
|March 30 — April 3
|Gianella Marengo
|Verónica Robertsnominated by Valentina R.
|Juan Pablo Alfonsonominated by Pancho
|Nelson Mauricio Pacheconominated by Pancho
|Francisco "Pancho" Rodrígueznominated by Iair
!—
|Francisco "Pancho" Rodríguez
|Verónica Roberts
|-
|April 6 — 10
!—
|Belén Muñoznominated by Gianella
|Constanza Vivasnominated by Chapu
|Noelia Gramajonominated by Pancho
|Juan Pablo Alfonsonominated by Valentina R.
!—
|Belén Muñoz
|Noelia Gramajo
|-
|April 13 — 17
|Francisco "Pancho" Rodríguez
|Laura Prietonominated by Belén
|Valeria Orteganominated by Chapu
|Francisco "Chapu" Puellesnominated by Mara
|Gianella Marengonominated by Belén
|Daniel Fernández
|Chapu and Laura
|Daniel Fernández
|-
|April 20 — 24
|Valentina Roth
|Valeria Orteganominated by Gianella
|Laura Prietonominated by Chapu
|Francisco "Pancho" Rodrígueznominated by Juan Pablo
|Juan Pablo Alfonsonominated by Pancho
!—
|Laura Prieto
|Juan Pablo Alfonso
|-
|April 27 — May 1
|Gianella Marengo
|Francisco "Chapu" Puellesnominated by Laura
|Felipe Camusnominated by Chapu
|Iair Motlesnominated by Pancho
|Valentina Arcenominated by Pancho
!—
|Francisco "Chapu" Puelles
|Felipe Camus
|-
|May 4 — 08
|Valentina Roth
|Laura Prietonominated by Belén
|Valeria Orteganominated by Constanza
|Belén Muñoz GMnominated by Chapu
|Constanza Vivasnominated by Belén
!—
|Valeria Ortega
|Constanza Vivas
|-
|May 11 — 15
|Valentina Roth
|Gianella Marengonominated by Belén
|Laura Prietonominated by Chapu
|Paola Torresnominated by Pancho
|Valentina Arce and Iair Motlesnominated by Pancho
!—
|Laura Prieto
|Iair Motles
|-
|May 18 — 22
|Francisco "Chapu" Puelles
|Valentina Arcenominated by Ronny
|Ronny "Dance" Munizaganominated by Nelson
|Alain Soulatnominated by Gianella
|Valeria Orteganominated by Gianella
|Paola Torres
|Valeria Ortega
|Paola Torres
|-
|May 25 — 29
!—
|Belén Muñoznominated by Gianella
|Gianella Marengonominated by Chapu
|Valeria Orteganominated by Chapu
|Laura Prietonominated by Valeria
!—
|Belén Muñoz
|Laura Prieto
|-
|June 8 — 12
|Francisco "Pancho" Rodríguez
|Francisco "Chapu" Puellesnominated by Alain
|Alain Soulatnominated by Ronny
|Valentina Arcenominated by Noelia
|Noelia Gramajonominated by Valeria
!—
|Francisco "Chapu" Puelles
|Valentina Arce
|-
|June 15 — 19
!—
|Alain Soulatnominated by Felipe
|Valeria Orteganominated by Valentina R.
|Nelson Mauricio Pacheconominated by Ronny
|Noelia Gramajonominated by Chapu
!—
|Valeria Ortega
|Noelia Gramajo
|-
|June 22 — 26
!—
|Felipe Camusnominated by Chapu
|Valeria Orteganominated by Valentina R.
|Francisco "Chapu" Puellesnominated by Belén
!—
!—
|Valeria Ortega
|Felipe Camus
|-
|June 29 — July 3
!—
|Belén Muñoznominated by Gianella
|Laura Prietonominated by Ronny
|Alain Soulatnominated by Chapu
!—
!—
|Laura Prieto
|Alain Soulat
|}

 not compete for lesion
 Nicolás Oyarzún gave his place

Individual competition

 sent by the public to the big final

Elimination order

References 
La Movida No Pudo con su Debut
Martin Carcamo Interview

External links 
Web official Site
Become a Calle 7 Fan

2009 Chilean television seasons